Chiang Wei-ling (born 2 September 1957) is a Taiwanese educator. He was the Minister of the Ministry of Education (MOE) of the Executive Yuan in 2012–2014. He is also the former President of National Central University in Taoyuan.

ROC Education Ministry

Taiwan-run education centers in Vietnam closure
In February 2013, three Taiwan-run education centers in Vietnam specializing in teaching and teacher training on Chinese language were closed down due to financial difficulties. Initially they tried to share the cost between MOE and local institutions. However, the institution decided that the operation of these education centers were not cost-effective. However, in April 2013 Chiang reiterated ROC government continuing commitment in promoting Chinese language education overseas. Even the MOE official stationed in Vietnam said that if there is any institution interested in running the education centers, they can seek help from the ministry.

Retirement limit
In early May 2013, Chiang said that he will continue to push on a proposal for a limit on pension for retired public school teachers who still continue teaching at private school after his proposal was recently turned down by the Executive Yuan, in which the cabinet is in favor of having equal treatment for retired teachers, military personnel and civil servants. The proposal planned by Chiang will include a package of government reforms aimed at improving Taiwan's retirement insurance system for retired teachers, military personnel and civil servants, in which the current operating system is not sustainable enough for long term due to low contributions and high replacement rate.

Shoeing towards President Ma Ying-jeou
In end of October 2013, in response to the growing number of shoeing towards President Ma Ying-jeou, Chiang said that college students who want to express their views should do in a rational way instead of resorting to the inappropriate act of throwing shoes at leaders of government. They have the right to express their opinions about the government, but they should not throw shoes at anyone. Chiang added that people should treat each other with respect and engage in rational communication in order not to create a negative impact on Taiwan's democratic development.

National curriculum revision
In early 2014, the Ministry of Education proposed the revision of high school curriculum to be more China-centrist. Among the changes are to use the term Mainland China instead of China in referring to Mainland China, learn about Zheng Cheng-gong as Ming Dynasty ruler in Taiwan, the Dutch and Spaniard merely entered Taiwan instead of ruling it etc. Chiang said that everything is inline with the constitution of the Republic of China under the Act Governing Relations between the People of the Taiwan Area and the Mainland Area. As of February 2014, the policy has been passed and would be implemented in the next school year.

Resignation
On 14 July 2014, Chiang tendered his resignation to Premier Jiang Yi-huah over an alleged academic fraud. He then would return to his teaching position at National Central University.

References

1957 births
Living people
Presidents of National Central University
Taiwanese Ministers of Education